The Dartmouth Literacy conference started on August 20, 1966, and lasted a little over three weeks until September 16, 1966. The meetings original name was "Anglo-American Conference on the Teaching and Learning of English", but with the conference occurring at Dartmouth college it became widely known as "The Dartmouth Seminar". The Seminar was the foundation of change for the teaching of English and Literature in the United States and the United Kingdom.

1966 Dartmouth Literacy Conference 
The location of the Seminar was in Sanborn Hall which is still the English Department at Dartmouth college today. The purpose of the conference was to rework how English was taught as a whole, and to determine what the purpose of what English was. The conference consisted of teachers from the United States, the United Kingdom, and a few teachers from Canada. The conference had a big variety of people who taught different levels of education. It ranged from teachers who taught elementary school all the way to college professors. There were about 70 people who took part in the Dartmouth literacy conference with about 50 English teachers and 20 others. The educators had degrees in linguistics, literature, English, and others. Even after the seminar the people continued to work on important issues with the English curriculum.

The organizer of the conference was Jim Squire. He received help from Arthur Jensen, a professor at Dartmouth, who was in charge of things locally, Albert Marckwardt, who was a linguist from Princeton, and Frank Whitehead from Sheffield University in the United Kingdom. The seminar was so impactful that it had formed the foundation for the teaching and writing of English in schools today.

Leading up to the Conference 

The decision to have a conference about literacy was because of the standards that were beginning to fall in the United states schools. The differences between the way teaching in the United states and the United Kingdom also rose the question of whether or not the education was adequate especially for English education. The things that American professors found surprising is that British educators don't have any written curriculum. The massive curriculum that the Americans were using surprised the British educators as well.

When selecting a location of the conference they wanted to find a place where the members would not be distracted easily. The decision of Dartmouth college was taken because the college was in a rural area and it would keep the participant away from the city nightlife. When leading up to the conference, it was decided that Herbert Muller and John Dixon would write about the conference. Although they were the only ones who reported on the conference, there was no formal agreement that the other participants could not give their point of view of the conference. Many of the participants had done studies and test before the conference which led them to have useful information to share with the others, An example is Albert Kitzhaber, who had done multiple different studies in the 1950s and the early 1960s that lead to the conclusion that they used poor textbooks, and had many other confusions in the curriculum. Leading up to the conference they decided on some topics of concern that everybody had towards the teaching of English. They came up with eleven topics of concern and they are " ... the role and significance of the learner in the English classroom, the activities, subject matter, and conditions of the English classroom, the training-- both pre-service and in-service-- of the classroom teacher, and the importance of educating the public on what is meant by good English and what is meant by good English teaching." These concerns came from different levels of English education where some topics were more focused on elementary level English while others focus on college level English.

At/After the Conference 
The conference was set up to have everyone split up into group of five or six people, and they would go over certain topics, and then they would reconvene with everyone else and discuss. The conference had three main topics being the place of literature in the  

school curriculum, the definition of English as a classroom subject, and the training of English teachers. The definition of English as a classroom subject was further broken down into other topics of interest like the meaning of "standard English", the interaction between speech and writing, the attention to process, and the role of technology effecting English.

Another question that needed an answer was what is the definition of English? They noticed that at the conference everyone could come up with relatively similar answers, but nobody could agree on the methodology that it should be taught. After combining the information that they knew they came to the conclusion that everyone learns in their own ways, but most people pick up language and grammar at earlier ages of around 5 to 6 years old. This helped to determine the new curriculum when teaching children to read and write.

The third topic that was discussed later on in the conference is instead of focusing on the process of English, they needed to focus on the product of it. Dixon who was at the conference stated "that this was an issue for some of the people are the conference." Literature in the English curriculum was one of the three main topics of the seminar. This topic had some disputed opinion on what should be done, but the overall consensus was that regarding literature a teacher should select topics that are diverse with information and knowledge to allow students to experience numerous perspectives. They also went on to say that the goal for the teacher is to make literature a joy for others. With teachers making literature and English more of a joy for other, it will make children more willing and likely to learn the subjects.

The topics of the conference so far have mainly focused on lower level English education, but there were multiple topics of college and university level English discussed. They went on to discuss how when people go to college they simply go for the degree for a better life down the road versus actually learning the material. They discussed ways for English educations to be different in colleges or universities, but they came up with mixed results.

Another one of the main three topics discussed at the conference was the training of the teachers or professors in both pre-service and in-service. This was the part of conference where it set up checkpoints for the English teachers to learn. Some of the requirements for the English teachers is that they should be familiar with who they are teaching, know the history of language, and they should be able to teach multiple types of literature like teaching speaking, dramatics, and creative writing. This would allow for teachers to have a better understanding of how they should teach English or literature depending on their students.

The Conference had a very big impact on how English and literature were taught in the United States and the United Kingdom for multiple years after the conference. There was no consensus curriculum although they had originally planned for it after the conference. Although they didn't create any curriculum many papers and books were written after attending the conference.

People From the Conference 
The Dartmouth literacy conference consisted of around 50 English teachers from the United States and the United Kingdom and a few from Canada. During this time the few women who attended the conference were not mentioned much in formal writings. Some women were at the conference, and they had no documentation of it afterwards saying that they ever attended it. Some of the people who attended that conference included:

 James Squire - Ran the Conference, attended the university of Illinois, and was the Executive secretary of the National Council of Teachers of English (NCTE)
 Albert Kitzhaber - Also collaborated with the conference and was involved in Project English, and the Conference on College Composition and Communication (CCCC). He was also a professor at the University of Oregon and Dartmouth College throughout his career.
 Frank Whitehead - Worked at Sheffield University in the United Kingdom and helped to organize the seminar.
 Albert Marckwardt - Was the director of the conference and a linguist at Princeton. During the time of the seminar he was the president of the NCTE.
 Wayne O'Neil - Was an employee at the University of Harvard and was a big help to Albert Kitzhaber with developing curriculum and working with the teachers certain skills.
 Arthur Jensen - Helped the participants in the four week seminar with their local arrangement like housing.
 Boris Ford - Member of the National Association for the Teaching of English (NATE) council who worked closely with the NCTE. He was from the United Kingdom and taught at the University of Sussex.
 Peter Caws - Was from the Carnegie Corporation of New York which donated $150,000 dollars to help sponsor the seminar.
 John Fisher - Was a member of the Modern Language Association (MLA).
 Douglas Barnes - Member of the NATE who also worked closely with the NCTE.
 James E. Miller - Promoted the learning of English at younger ages where students were to be considered literate by Grade 8 or 9.
 Wayne Booth - Was a powerful Dartmouth college employee who was also friends with Harold Rosen where they fought in world war II together.
 Herbert Muller - Was an American from the conference who wrote "A Blueprint for a New Direction in the Teaching of English in Anglo-American Countries". Also, Muller was in charge of the seminar activities, and was from Indiana university.
 John Dixon - Was in charge of the seminar activities with Herbert Muller, and he was from Bretton Hall College of Education in Yorkshire.
 James Britton - was one of the most important British delegates and argued that it was more important student growth and processes of English being taught compared to just the context of English.
 Connie Rosen - Was the wife of Harold Rosen, and initially wasn't allowed into the conference until they protested because she had the same amount of qualification as her husband who was at the conference.
 Harold Rosen - Was the husband of Connie Rosen, and worked closely with Wayne Booth at the conference because they fought together in world war II.
 John Scott-Craig -  Was the son of a Dartmouth faculty member and would regularly help out with seminars at the college including the literacy conference of 1966. He was also a student at the Yale at the time of the seminar.
 Basil Bernstein - Was known to argue with Boris Ford about the topics at the literacy conference and was very adamant about the "restricted language" of children from certain backgrounds.
 Barbara Hardy - Was one of the few women at the conference and she was one of the British delegates which aided in changing the tenor of the conference.
 William Robson - Was a British delegate which helped in changing the tenor of the conference with Barbara Hardy.
 James Moffett - Lead the topic of Student-centered idea that children should take hand in their own education.
 F.R. Leavis - Was Affiliated with the British Contingent and was a big influence in keeping the subject of literature a topic at the seminar. He was from Cambridge and an editor of a magazine called Scrutiny.
 L.C Knights - Worked with the English teaching reform  and was very influential in the group of British people attending the conference.
 Lev Vygostsky - Work with LATE before the Dartmouth conference and was an important British representative at the conference.
 Miriam Wilt - Did not have a major role verbally in the conference, but was very important towards elementary education.
 Jean Piaget - Worked closely with Lev Vygostsky and LATE.

References 

Donahue, Christiane. "A Brief History (from the US perspective)". 50th Anniversary Dartmouth Institute and Conference, 13 May 2016. https://dartmouthwritinginstitute.wordpress.com/1966-seminar/a-brief-history/

Donahue, Christiane. "Impact of the 1966 Seminar". 50th Anniversary Dartmouth Institute and Conference. 2016-05-13. Retrieved 2022-03-21. https://dartmouthwritinginstitute.wordpress.com/1966-seminar/impact/

“Global Goals for English: NCTE and the Dartmouth Seminar.” National Council of Teachers of English Archives at the University of Illinois, https://archives.library.illinois.edu/ncte/about/july.php

Miller, James E. “What Happened at Dartmouth? (A Query by One Who Was There).” What Happened at Dartmouth?, Oct. 1969, https://files.eric.ed.gov/fulltext/ED039249.pdf#page=8&zoom=auto,-17,165.

Sublette, Jack R. “The Dartmouth Conference: Its Reports and Results.” College English, vol. 35, no. 3, National Council of Teachers of English, 1973, pp. 348–57, https://doi.org/10.2307/374999.

Vee, Annette. “What was the Dartmouth Seminar?” The WAC Clearinghouse, Dec. 2020, https://wac.colostate.edu/resources/research/dartmouth/introduction-what-was-the-dartmouth-seminar/.

Wikipedia Student Program
1966 conferences